Two human polls comprised the 1968 NCAA University Division football rankings. Unlike most sports, college football's governing body, the NCAA, does not bestow a national championship, instead that title is bestowed by one or more different polling agencies. There are two main weekly polls that begin in the preseason—the AP Poll and the Coaches Poll.

Legend

AP Poll
For the 1968 season, the AP Poll returned to ranking 20 teams per week, after ranking only 10 per week from 1961 to 1967. This was also the second time (first since 1965) that the final AP Poll was conducted in January after the completion of bowl season, rather than at the end of the regular season. The final poll would continue to be conducted after bowl season from this season forward.

Final Coaches Poll
The final UPI Coaches Poll was released prior to the bowl games, in early December.Ohio State received 28 of the 34 first-place votes; USC received four and Penn State two.

Notre Dame did not participate in bowl games from 1925 through 1968.
 Prior to the 1975 season, the Big Ten and Pac-8 conferences allowed only one postseason participant each, for the Rose Bowl.
 The Ivy League has prohibited its members from participating in postseason football since the league was officially formed in 1954.

References

College football rankings